

The Moseley Iron Bridge Company was founded by Thomas William Moseley in Cincinnati, Ohio around 1858 and existed until 1879.  Moseley was an engineer, bridge builder, and designer.  John Paul Verree used T.W.H. Moseley's designs for his bridge manufacturing business in Philadelphia, Pennsylvania.

History
Zenas King was hired by Moseley as a salesperson and represented Moseley at many bridge lettings, mainly in southern Ohio.  King remained in Ohio and started his own bridge building business in Cleveland. In 1861, Moseley decided to move the company to Boston, Massachusetts.  Moseley moved his business to Boston when he discovered marketing his iron bridge designs were ideal for areas in the New England area. The company was also known as the Moseley Iron Bridge Works of Boston.
 
The company changed names and locations several times between 1858 and 1879, including Philadelphia and New York.

Known Moseley bridges
Railroad Bridge (1858)—Formerly spanning Sterrns Creek north of Ironton, removed and placed on exhibition in the Henry Ford Museum in Dearborn, Michigan.
Murphy Road Bridge (c.1860)—Formerly spanning Walloomsac River, moved in 1958 to Bennington Museum, Bennington, Vermont; Thomas W.H. Moseley, designer, Moseley Iron Building Works, Boston, builder
Upper Pacific Mills Bridge (1864)—North Canal, Lawrence, Massachusetts; Thowas W. Moseley, designer, Moseley Iron Building Works, Boston, builder
Hare's Hill Road Bridge (1869)—Hare's Hill Road over French Creek, Kimberton, Pennsylvania; Thomas W. Moseley, designer, Moseley Iron Bridge & Roof Company, builder
Monadnock Mills Bridge (1870)—Workers' access to Monadnock Mills, Claremont, New Hampshire; Thomas W. Moseley, designer, Moseley Iron Bridge & Roof Company, builder

See also
Thomas William Moseley
Hares Hill Road Bridge
Moseley Wrought Iron Arch Bridge
Zenas King

References and notes

Defunct engineering companies of the United States
Companies based in Ohio
American companies established in 1858
American companies disestablished in 1879